Mulciber undulatoides is a species of beetle in the family Cerambycidae. It was described by Stephan Von Breuning in 1940.

References

Homonoeini
Beetles described in 1940